This article contains a partial listing of leaders of American universities and colleges, who are usually given the title president or chancellor.

A
Abilene Christian University – Royce Money, Chancellor; Phil Schubert, President
Adams State University – David A. Tandberg, President
Adelphi University – Christine Riordan, President
Adrian College – Jeffrey R. Docking, President
Agnes Scott College – Leocadia I. Zak, President
Alaska Pacific University – Bob Onders, President
Albany College of Pharmacy and Health Sciences – T. Gregory Dewey, President
Albion College – Joseph Calvaruso, Interim President
Albright College – Jacquelyn S. Fetrow, President
Allegheny College – Hilary L. Link, President
Alma College – Jeffrey Abernathy, President
Alvernia University – John R. Loyack, President
Alverno College – Andrea Lee, President
The American College – George Nichols III, President
American InterContinental University – John Kline, Chancellor and President
American University – Sylvia Mathews Burwell, President
Amherst College – Michael A. Elliott, President
Anderson University (South Carolina) – Evans P. Whitaker, President
Andover Newton Theological School – Martin B. Copenhaver, President
Appalachian College of Pharmacy – Michael McGlothlin, President
Appalachian School of Law – B. Keith Faulkner, Dean
Appalachian State University – Sheri Everts, Chancellor
Arizona State University – Michael M. Crow, President
Arkansas Baptist College – Regina H. Favors, Interim President
Art Institute of Atlanta – David N. Pugh, President
The Art Institute of Virginia Beach – Charles Restivo, President
Atlantic University – Kevin J. Todeschi, CEO
Athens State University – Philip Way, President
Auburn University – Christopher B. Roberts, President
Augustana College – Steven C. Bahls, President
Austin College – Steven O'Day, President
Averett University – Tiffany M. Franks, President
Avila University – Ronald A. Slepitza, President

B
Bacone College – Ferlin Clark, President
Barber-Scotia College – Tracey Flemmings, Interim President
Baylor College of Medicine – Paul Klotman, President and CEO
Baylor University – Linda Livingstone, President
Belmont Abbey College – William K. Thierfelder, President
Beloit College – Scott Bierman, President
Bemidji State University – Faith C. Hensrud, President
Bennett College – Suzanne Elise Walsh, President
Bentley University – E. LaBrent Chrite, President
Bloomfield College – Marcheta P. Evans, President
Boise State University – Marlene Tromp, President
Boston College – William P. Leahy, President
Boston University – Robert A. Brown, President
Brandeis University – Ronald D. Liebowitz, President
Bridgerland Technical College – Chad K. Campbell, President
Brigham Young University – Kevin J Worthen, President
Brigham Young University–Hawaii – John S. K. Kauwe III, President
Brigham Young University–Idaho – Henry J. Eyring, President
Brown University – Christina Paxson, President
Bryn Mawr College – Kimberly Wright Cassidy, President

C
California Institute of Technology (Caltech) – Thomas Felix Rosenbaum, President
California State University System – Steve Relyea, Acting Chancellor
California Maritime Academy – Thomas A. Cropper, President
California Polytechnic State University – Jeffrey Armstrong, President
California State Polytechnic University, Pomona – Soraya M. Coley, President
California State University, Bakersfield – Lynnette Zelezny, President
California State University, Channel Islands – Richard Yao, President
California State University, Chico – Gayle E. Hutchinson, President
California State University, Dominguez Hills – Thomas A. Parham, President
California State University, East Bay – Cathy Sandeen, President
California State University, Fresno – Saúl Jiménez-Sandoval, President
California State University, Fullerton – Framroze Virjee, President
California State University, Long Beach – Jane Close Conoley, President
California State University, Los Angeles – William A. Covino, President
California State University, Monterey Bay – Eduardo M. Ochoa, President
California State University, Northridge – Erika D. Beck, President
California State University, Sacramento – Robert S. Nelsen, President
California State University, San Bernardino – Tomás D. Morales, President
California State University, San Marcos – Ellen Neufeldt, President
California State University, Stanislaus – Ellen Junn, President
Humboldt State University – Tom Jackson Jr., President
San Diego State University – Adela de la Torre, President
San Francisco State University – Lynn Mahoney, President
San Jose State University – Mary Papazian, President
Sonoma State University – Judy K. Sakaki, President
Cameron University – John M. McArthur, President
Cardinal Stritch University – Daniel J. Scholz, Interim President
Carnegie Mellon University – Farnam Jahanian, Interim President
Case Western Reserve University – Eric Kaler, President
The Catholic University of America – John H. Garvey, President
Central College (Iowa) – Mark Putnam, President
Centre College – Milton C. Moreland, President
Chapman University – Daniele C. Struppa, President
The Citadel, The Military College of South Carolina – John W. Rosa, President
 The City University of New York (CUNY) – James Milliken, Chancellor
Baruch College – Mitchel B. Wallerstein, President
Borough of Manhattan Community College – Antonio Pérez, President
Bronx Community College – Thomas A. Isekenegbe, President
Brooklyn College – Michelle Anderson, President
City College of New York – Vincent Boudreau, Interim President
College of Staten Island – William J. Fritz, President
Graduate Center, CUNY – Chase F. Robinson, President
CUNY Graduate School of Journalism – Sarah Bartlett, Dean
CUNY School of Law – Mary Lu Bilek, Dean
CUNY School of Medicine – Maurizio Trevisan, Dean
CUNY School of Professional Studies – John Mogulescu, Dean
CUNY School of Public Health – Ayman El-Mohandes, Dean
Guttman Community College – Scott E. Evenbeck, President
Hostos Community College – David Gómez, President
Hunter College – Jennifer Raab, President
John Jay College of Criminal Justice – Karol Mason, President
Kingsborough Community College – Peter Cohen, President
LaGuardia Community College – Gail Mellow, President
Lehman College – José Luis Cruz, President
Medgar Evers College – Rudy Crew, President
New York City College of Technology – Russell K. Hotzler, President
Queens College, City University of New York – Félix V. Matos Rodríguez, President
Queensborough Community College – Diane B. Call, President
William E. Macaulay Honors College – Mary C. Pearl, Dean
York College, City University of New York – Marcia V. Keizs, President
Claremont McKenna College – Hiram Chodosh, President
Claremont Graduate University – Jacob Adams, President
Clayton State University – Thomas "Tim" Hynes, President
Clemson University – James P. Clements, President
Coahoma Community College – Valmadge Towner, President
The College of New Jersey – R. Barbara Gitenstein, President
College of William and Mary – W. Taylor Reveley III, President
Colorado College – Jill Tiefenthaler, President
Colorado School of Mines – Paul C. Johnson, President
Colorado State University – Joyce E. McConnell, President
Columbia University – Lee Bollinger, President
Connecticut State University System – Mark E. Ojakian, President
Central Connecticut State University – Zulma R. Toro Ramos, President
Eastern Connecticut State University – Elsa Nuñez, President
Southern Connecticut State University – Joe Bertolino, President
Western Connecticut State University – John B. Clark, President
Cornell University – Martha E. Pollack, President

D
Dartmouth College – Philip J. Hanlon, President
Davidson College – Carol Quillen, President
Davis & Elkins College – Chris Wood, President
Delaware State University – Harry Lee Williams, President
DePaul University – A. Gabriel Esteban, President
DePauw University – Mark McCoy, President
Dickinson College – Margee Ensign, President
Drew University – MaryAnn Baenninger, President
Drexel University – John Anderson Fry, President
Drury University – Timothy Cloyd, President
Duke University – Vincent Price, President

E
East Carolina University – Cecil Staton, Chancellor
Eastern Michigan University – James M. Smith, President
Eastern New Mexico University – J.S. (Jeff) Elwell, President
Eastern Oregon University – Tom Insko, President
Edward Waters University – Nathaniel Glover, President
Elizabethtown College – Carl Strikwerda, President
Emily Griffith Opportunity School – Jeff Barratt, Executive Director
Emmanuel College (Massachusetts) – Janet Eisner, President
Emory University – Claire E. Sterk, President

F
Fairmont State University – Stephen Jones, President
Ferris State University – David Eisler, President
Ferrum College – Jennifer Braatan, President
Fisk University – Kevin D. Rome, President
Florida A&M University – Larry Robinson, President
Florida Atlantic University – John W. Kelly, President
Florida Gulf Coast University – Mike Martin, President
Florida International University – Mark B. Rosenberg, President
Florida Memorial University – Roslyn Artis, President
Florida Southern College – Anne B. Kerr, President
Florida State University – John E. Thrasher, President
Fordham University – Tania Tetlow, President
Fort Valley State University – Paul Jones, President
Franklin & Marshall College – Daniel R. Porterfield, President
Furman University – Elizabeth Davis, President

G
Georgia Institute of Technology – G. P. "Bud" Peterson, President
George Mason University – Gregory Washington, President
George Washington University – Thomas LeBlanc, President
Georgetown University – John J. DeGioia, President
Glenville State University – Mark A. Manchin, President
Grambling State University – Rick Gallot, President
Gratz College – Paul Finkelman, President
Grinnell College – Raynard S. Kington, President

H
Hamline University – Fayneese Miller, President
Hampton University – William Harvey, President
Harris-Stowe State University – LaTonia Collins-Smith, President 
Harrisburg University of Science and Technology – Eric Darr, President
Harvard University – Claudine Gay, President
Harvey Mudd College – Maria Klawe, President
Haverford College – Kimberly Benston, President
Howard University – Wayne A.I. Frederick, President

I
Idaho State University – Kevin Satterlee, President
Illinois College – Barbara Farley, President
Illinois Institute of Art - Chicago – Josh Pond, President
Illinois Institute of Technology – Alan Cramb, President
Illinois State University – Larry Dietz, President
Indiana Institute of Technology – Karl Einolf, President
Indiana University – Michael McRobbie, President
Indiana University East – Kathryn Cruz-Uribe, Chancellor
Indiana University Kokomo – Susan Sciame-Giesecke, Chancellor
Indiana University Northwest – William Lowe, Chancellor
Indiana University South Bend – Terry Allison, Chancellor
Indiana University Southeast – Ray Wallace, Chancellor
Indiana University - Purdue University Indianapolis – Nasser Paydar, Chancellor
Indiana University - Purdue University Fort Wayne – Vicky Carwein, Chancellor
Indiana University - Purdue University Columbus – Reinhold Hill, Vice-Chancellor
Indiana State University – Daniel Barley, President
Iowa State University – Wendy Wintersteen, President
Ithaca College – Shirley Collado, President

J
Jackson State University – William Bynum, President
Jarvis Christian University – Lester Newman, President
Jewish Theological Seminary of America – Arnold Eisen, Chancellor
Johns Hopkins University – Ronald J. Daniels, President
Johnson C. Smith University – Ronald L. Carter, President

K
Kansas State University – Richard Myers, President
Kean University – Dawood Farahi, President
Kent State University – Beverly J. Warren, President
Kent State University at Stark – Denise Seachrist, Dean
Kentucky State University – M. Christopher Brown II, President
Kettering University – Robert McMahan, President

L
Lane College – Logan Hampton, President
Langston University – Kent Smith, President
Lawrence Technological University – Tarek Sobh, President
Lawrence University – Laurie Carter, President
LDS Business College – Bruce Kusch, President
Lehigh University – John Simon, President
Lewis & Clark College – David Ellis, President
Liberty University – Jerry Falwell Jr., Chancellor and President
Lincoln University (Pennsylvania) – Brenda Allen, President
Lincoln University of Missouri – Kevin Rome, President
Louisiana State University – William F. Tate IV, President
Loyola Marymount University – Timothy Law Snyder, President
Lubbock Christian University – L. Timothy Perrin, President

M
Manhattan College – Brennan O'Donnell, President
Massachusetts Institute of Technology – L. Rafael Reif, President
Miami Dade College – Eduardo J. Padrón, President
Michigan State University – Samuel L. Stanley, President
Michigan Technological University – Richard_J._Koubek, President
Miles College – George French, President
Mississippi State University – Mark E. Keenum, President
Montana State University – Waded Cruzado, President
Morehouse College – Harold Martin Jr., President
Morgan State University – David Wilson, President

N
New Saint Andrews College – Benjamin R. Merkle, President
New York University – Andrew D. Hamilton, President
Niagara University – James J. Maher, President
North Dakota State University – Dean L. Bresciani, President
North Carolina Central University – Johnson Akinleye, Chancellor
Northern Arizona University – Rita Cheng, President
Northeastern University – Joseph E. Aoun, President
Northeastern State University – Steve Turner, President
Northwest Nazarene University – Joel Pearsall, President
Northwestern University – Morton O. Schapiro, President

O
Oakland University – Ora Hirsch Pescovitz, President
Oberlin College – Carmen Twillie Ambar, President
Occidental College – Jonathan Veitch, President
Oglethorpe University – Lawrence Schall, President
Ohio State University – Michael V. Drake, President
Ohio State University, Marion Campus – Gregory Rose, Dean/Director
Ohio State University, Lima Campus – Charlene Gilbert, Dean/Director
Ohio State University, Mansfield Campus – Stephen Gavazzi, Dean/Director
Ohio State University, Newark Campus – William MacDonald, Dean/Director
Ohio University – Duane Nellis, President
Oklahoma Baptist University – David W. Whitlock, President
Oklahoma City University – Robert Harlan Henry, President
Oklahoma State University - Oklahoma City – Scott Newman, President
Oklahoma State University - Stillwater – Kayse Shrum
Oklahoma State University - Tulsa – Pamela Martin Frye
Oral Roberts University – William Wilson, President
Oregon Health & Science University – Joseph Robertson, President
Oregon State University – Edward John Ray, President
Otterbein University – Kathy Krendl, President

P
Pace University – Marvin Krislov, President
Pennsylvania State System of Higher Education – Frank Brogan, Chancellor
Bloomsburg University of Pennsylvania – Bashar Hanna, President
California University of Pennsylvania – Geraldine M. Jones, President
Cheyney University of Pennsylvania – Aaron Walton, President
Clarion University of Pennsylvania – Karen Whitney, President
East Stroudsburg University of Pennsylvania – Marica Welsh, President
Edinboro University of Pennsylvania – H. Fred Walker, President
Indiana University of Pennsylvania – Michael Driscoll, President
Kutztown University of Pennsylvania – Kenneth Hawkinson, President
Lock Haven University of Pennsylvania – Michael Fiorentino, Jr., President
Mansfield University of Pennsylvania – Scott Barton, President
Millersville University of Pennsylvania – John M. Anderson, President
Shippensburg University of Pennsylvania – Laurie Carter, President
Slippery Rock University of Pennsylvania – Cheryl Norton, President
West Chester University – Christopher Fiorentino, President
Pennsylvania State University – Eric J. Barron, President
Pepperdine University – Andrew K. Benton, President
Pitzer College – Melvin L. Oliver, President
Pomona College – , President
Portland State University – Rahmat Shoureshi, President
Prairie View A&M University – Ruth Simmons, Interim President
Presbyterian College – Matthew vandenBerg, President
Princeton University – Christopher L. Eisgruber, President
Purdue University – Mitch Daniels, President

R
Ralston College – Stephen J. Blackwood, President
Reed College – Audrey Bilger, President
Rensselaer Polytechnic Institute – Martin A. Schmidt, President
Rice University – Reginald DesRoches, President

S
Saint Francis University – Malachi Van Tassell, President
St. John's College (Annapolis/Santa Fe) – Nora Demleitner, Annapolis President; Mark Roosevelt, Santa Fe President
St. Lawrence University – William Fox, President
Saint Louis University – Fred Pestello, President
St. Mary's College of Maryland – Tuajuanda C. Jordan, President
Santa Clara University – Michael Engh, President
Savannah State University – Cheryl Davenport Dozier, President
Scripps College – Lara Tiedens, President
Seattle University – Stephen Sundborg, President
Seton Hall University – Mary Meehan, Interim President
Shimer College – Susan Henking, President
Shippensburg University – Laurie Carter, President
South Dakota State University – Barry Dunn, President
Southeastern Louisiana University – John L. Crain, President
Southern Illinois University – Randy Dunn, President
Southern Illinois University Carbondale – Carlo Montemagno, Chancellor
Southern Illinois University Edwardsville – Randall Pembroke, Chancellor
Southern Methodist University – R. Gerald Turner, President
Southern New Hampshire University – Paul J. LeBlanc, President
Southern Oregon University – Linda Schott, President
Southern Utah University – Scott L. Wyatt, President
Southern Virginia University – Reed N. Wilcox, President
Southwest Baptist University – C. Pat Taylor, President
Southwestern College – Bradley J. Andrews, President
Stanford University – Marc Tessier-Lavigne, President
State University of New York System – Kristina M. Johnson, Chancellor
University at Albany, SUNY – Havidan Rodriguez, President
Binghamton University – Harvey G. Stenger, President
University at Buffalo – Satish K. Tripathi, President
Stony Brook University – Samuel Stanley, President
Stetson University – Wendy B. Libby, President
Stevens Institute of Technology – Nariman Farvardin, President
Syracuse University – Kent Syverud, Chancellor

T
Taylor University – D. Michael Lindsay, President
Temple University – Jason Wingard, President
Tennessee State University – Glenda Basin Glover, President
Tennessee Technological University – Philip Oldham, President
Texas Christian University – Victor Boschini, Chancellor
Texas State University System – Brian McCall, Chancellor
Lamar University – Kenneth Evans, President
Sam Houston State University – Dana G. Hoyt, President
Sul Ross State University – William Kibler, President
Texas State University – Denise Trauth, President
Texas Tech University System – Tedd L.Mitchell, Chancellor
Angelo State University – Brian J. May, President
Texas Tech University – Lawrence Schovanec, President
Texas Tech University Health Sciences Center – Tedd L.Mitchell, President
Towson University – Kim Schatzel, President
Trevecca Nazarene University – Dan Boone, President
Trine University – Earl D. Brooks, President
Trinity International University – David Dockery, President
Trinity University (Texas) – Danny J. Anderson, President
Trinity Washington University – Patricia McGuire, President
Truman State University – Susan L. Thomas, President
Tufts University – Anthony Monaco, President
Tulane University – Michael Fitts, President

University

University A
 University of Akron – Matthew J. Wilson, President
 University of Alabama System – C. Ray Hayes, Chancellor
 University of Alabama – Stuart R. Bell, President
 University of Alabama at Birmingham (UAB) – Ray L. Watts, President
 University of Alabama in Huntsville (UAH) – Robert Altenkirch, President
 University of Alaska – James R. Johnsen, President
 University of Alaska Anchorage – Sam Gingerich, Interim Chancellor
 University of Alaska Fairbanks – Daniel M. White, Chancellor
 University of Alaska Southeast – Rick Caulfield, Chancellor
 The University of Arizona – Robert C. Robbins, President
 University of Arkansas System – Donald R. Bobbitt, President
 University of Arkansas – Joseph Steinmetz, Chancellor
 University of Arkansas at Pine Bluff – Laurence B. Alexander, Chancellor

University C
University of California – Janet Napolitano, President
University of California, Berkeley – Carol T. Christ, Chancellor
University of California, Davis – Gary S. May, Chancellor
University of California, Irvine – Howard Gillman, Chancellor
University of California, Los Angeles – Gene D. Block, Chancellor
University of California, Merced – Dorothy Leland, Chancellor
University of California, Riverside – Kim A. Wilcox, Chancellor
University of California, San Diego – Pradeep Khosla, Chancellor
University of California, San Francisco – Sam Hawgood, Chancellor
University of California, Santa Barbara – Henry T. Yang, Chancellor
University of California, Santa Cruz – George Blumenthal, Chancellor
University of Central Florida – John C. Hitt, President
University of Central Missouri – Charles M. Ambrose, President
University of Chicago – Robert J. Zimmer, President
University of Colorado System – Bruce D. Benson, President
University of Colorado Boulder – Phil DiStefano, Chancellor
University of Colorado Colorado Springs – Venkat Reddy, Chancellor
University of Colorado Denver – Dorothy Horrell, Chancellor
University of Connecticut – Thomas C. Katsouleas, President
University of the Cumberlands – Larry L. Cockrum, President

University D
University of Dallas – Edward Burns, Chancellor; Thomas Keefe, President
University of Delaware – Dennis Assanis, President

University E

University F
University of Florida – W. Kent Fuchs, President

University G
University of Georgia – Jere Morehead, President

University H
University of Hawaii – David Lassner, President
University of Hawaii at Hilo – Donald O. Straney, Chancellor
University of Hawaii at Manoa – Robert Bley-Vroman, Chancellor
University of Hawaii Maui College – Lui Hokoana, Chancellor
University of Houston System – Renu Khator, Chancellor
University of Houston – Renu Khator, President
University of Houston–Clear Lake – Ira K. Blake, President
University of Houston–Downtown – Juan Sánchez Muñoz, President
University of Houston–Victoria – Raymond V. Morgan, President

University I
University of Idaho – Chuck Staben, President
University of Illinois system – Timothy L. Killeen, President
University of Illinois at Chicago – Michael Amiridis, Chancellor
University of Illinois Springfield – Susan Koch, Chancellor
University of Illinois Urbana-Champaign – Robert J. Jones, Chancellor
University of Indianapolis – Robert Manuel, President
University of Iowa – Bruce Harreld, President

University K
University of Kansas – Douglas Girod, Chancellor
University of Kentucky – Eli Capilouto, President

University L
University of Louisiana System – Jim Henderson, President
University of Louisiana at Lafayette – E. Joseph Savoie, President
University of Louisiana at Monroe – Nick Bruno, President
University of Louisville – Gregory Postel, Interim President

University M
University of Maine System – James H. Page, Chancellor
University of Maine – Susan J. Hunter, President
University of Maine at Augusta – Rebecca Wyke, President
University of Maine at Farmington – Kathryn Foster, President
University of Maine at Presque Isle – Ray Rice, President
University of Maryland, College Park – Darryll J. Pines, President
University of Maryland Eastern Shore – Heidi M. Anderson, President
University of Massachusetts – Marty Meehan, President
University of Massachusetts Amherst – Kumble R. Subbaswamy, Chancellor
University of Massachusetts Boston – Marcelo Suárez-Orozco, Chancellor
University of Massachusetts Dartmouth – Mark A. Fuller, Chancellor
University of Massachusetts Lowell – Jacqueline Moloney, Chancellor
University of Massachusetts Medical School – Michael Collins, Chancellor
University of Memphis – M. David Rudd, President
University of Miami – Julio Frenk, President
University of Michigan – Santa Ono, President
University of Michigan–Dearborn – Daniel Little, Chancellor
University of Michigan–Flint – Susan E. Borrego, Chancellor
University of Minnesota – Eric Kaler, President
University of Minnesota Crookston – Mary Holz-Clause, Chancellor
University of Minnesota Duluth – Lendley C. Black, Chancellor
University of Minnesota Morris – Michelle Behr, Chancellor
University of Minnesota Rochester – Stephen Lehmkuhle, Chancellor
University of Mississippi – Jeffrey Vitter, Chancellor
University of Missouri – Mun Choi, Chancellor
University of Montana – Sheila Stearns, President

University N
University of Nebraska system – Hank Bounds, President
University of Nebraska at Kearney – Douglas Kristensen, Chancellor
University of Nebraska–Lincoln – Ronnie Green, Chancellor
University of Nebraska Medical Center – Jeffrey P. Gold, Chancellor
University of Nebraska Omaha – Jeffrey P. Gold, Chancellor
University of Nevada, Las Vegas – Len Jessup, President
University of Nevada, Reno – Marc Johnson, President
University of New Hampshire – Mark Huddleston, President
University of New Mexico – Garnett S. Stokes, President
University of New Orleans – John Nicklow, President
University of North Carolina – Margaret Spellings, President
University of North Carolina at Asheville – Mary Grant, Chancellor
University of North Carolina at Chapel Hill – Carol Folt, Chancellor
University of North Carolina at Charlotte – Philip L. Dubois, Chancellor
University of North Carolina at Greensboro – Franklin Gilliam, Chancellor
University of North Carolina at Pembroke – Robin Cummings, Chancellor
University of North Carolina at Wilmington – Jose V. Sartarelli, Chancellor
University of North Dakota – Mark Kennedy, President
University of Notre Dame – John I. Jenkins, President

University O
University of Oklahoma – Joseph Harroz, President
University of Oregon – Michael H. Schill, President

University P
University of the Pacific – Pamela Eibeck, President
University of Pennsylvania – Amy Gutmann, President
University of Pittsburgh – Patrick D. Gallagher, Chancellor
University of Portland – Mark Poorman, President

University R
University of Rochester – Joel Seligman, President
University of Rhode Island – David Dooley, President

University S
University of South Carolina – Harris Pastides, President
University of South Dakota – James W. Abbott, President
University of Southern California – C. L. Max Nikias, President
University of Southern Mississippi – Rodney D. Bennett, President

University T
University of Tennessee system – Joseph A. DiPietro, President
University of Tennessee – Beverly J. Davenport, Chancellor
University of Tennessee at Chattanooga – Steve Angle, Chancellor
University of Tennessee at Martin – Keith Carver, Chancellor
University of Texas System – James Milliken, Chancellor
University of Texas at Arlington – Vistasp Karbhari, President
University of Texas at Austin – Gregory L. Fenves, President
University of Texas at Dallas – Richard Benson, President
University of Texas at El Paso – Diana Natalicio, President
University of Texas Rio Grande Valley – Guy Bailey, President
University of Texas at San Antonio – Thomas Taylor Eignmy, President
University of Texas at Tyler – Michael Tidwell, President
University of Tulsa – Brad Carson, President

University U
University of Utah – David W. Pershing, President

University V
University of Vermont – E. Thomas Sullivan, President
University of Virginia – Teresa A. Sullivan, President

University W
University of Washington – Ana Mari Cauce, President
University of Wisconsin System – Raymong W. Cross, President
University of Wisconsin–Madison – Jennifer Mnookin, Chancellor
University of Wisconsin–Milwaukee – Mark Mone, Chancellor
University of Wyoming – Laurie Nichols, President

U
Ursinus College – Jill Leauber Marsteller, Interim President
Utah State University – Noelle E. Cockett, President
Utah Valley University – Astrid S. Tuminez, President

V
Vanderbilt University – Daniel Diermeier, Chancellor
Virginia Commonwealth University – Michael Rao, President
Virginia Tech – Timothy D. Sands, President
Virginia Wesleyan University – Scott D. Miller, President

W
Wake Forest University – Susan Rae Wente, President
Washburn University – Jerry Farley, President
Washington and Lee University – William C. Dudley, President
Washington State University – Kirk Schulz, President
Washington State University, Vancouver – Mel Netzhammer, Chancellor
Wayne State University – M. Roy Wilson, President
Wentworth Institute of Technology – Mark A. Thompson, President
Western New Mexico University – Joseph Shepard, President
Western Oregon University – Jay Kenton, Interim President
West Virginia State University – Ericke S. Cage, Interim President
West Virginia University – E. Gordon Gee, President
West Virginia University at Parkersburg – Christopher Gilmer, President
Wheaton College – Philip Ryken, President
Whittier College – Linda Oubré, President
Wilberforce University – Elfred Anthony Pinkard, President
Wichita State University – Richard Muma, President
Willamette University – Stephen E. Thorsett, President
William Woods University – Jeremy L. Moreland, President
Winston-Salem State University – Elwood Robinson, Chancellor

X
Xavier University (Ohio) – Colleen Hanycz, President
Xavier University of Louisiana – Reynold Verret, President

Y
Yale University – Peter Salovey, President
Yeshiva University – Ari Berman, President

See also
Lists of university leaders

References

University and college leaders
 
United States education-related lists
United States